Ypthima pulchra is a butterfly in the family Nymphalidae. It is found in Nigeria, the Republic of the Congo, Angola, the Democratic Republic of the Congo, and Zambia.

References

pulchra
Butterflies described in 1954